Antonio Suárez Vázquez (20 May 1932 – 6 January 1981) was a professional road racing cyclist from Spain between 1956 and 1965. He is most famous for winning the overall title and the climbers classification at the 1959 Vuelta a España. In addition, Suarez won the points classification at the 1961 Vuelta and a career total of five stages at the Vuelta.

Suárez also won a stage and finished on the podium in third place at the 1961 Giro d’Italia behind Arnaldo Pambianco of Italy and Jacques Anquetil of France.

Major results

1957 – Guardio de Franco
 ???, Overall, Vuelta a España
 1st, Stage 16, (San Sebastián - Bilbao, 193 km)
 1st, Stage 7, Ruta del Sol
1958 – Lube
 1st, Stage 7, Ruta del Sol
 64th, Overall, Tour de France
1959 – Licor 43
 1st, Overall, Vuelta a España
 1st, King of the Mountains Classification
 1st, Stage 5, (Guadix -Murcia, 225 km)
 1st, Stage 10, (Granollers- Lérida, 183 km)
  Spanish National Cycling Road Race Champion
1960 – Faema
 Vuelta a España
 1st, Stage 14, (San Sebastián - Vitoria, 263 km)
  Spanish National Cycling Road Race Champion
 17th, Overall, Tour de France
1961 – Faema
 3rd, Overall, Giro d'Italia
 1st, Stage 7
 4th, Overall, Vuelta a España
 1st, Points classification
 1st, Stage 12, Valladolid -Palencia, 40 km (ITT)
  Spanish National Cycling Road Race Champion
1962 – Ghigi
 -
1963 – Faema-Flandria
 6th, Overall, Vuelta a España
 43rd, Overall, Tour de France
1964 – IBAC
 -
1965 – Tedi Montjuich
 -

External links

1932 births
1981 deaths
Spanish male cyclists
Vuelta a España winners
Cyclists from Madrid